Saint-Jean-sur-Erve is a former commune in the Mayenne department in north-western France. On 1 January 2017, it was merged into the new commune Blandouet-Saint Jean.

See also
Communes of the Mayenne department

References

Saintjeansurerve